The Rhode Island Hospital Trust Building is an historic commercial building in downtown Providence, Rhode Island, United States, designed by York & Sawyer.

Description
The Rhode Island Hospital Trust Building is an eleven-story steel-frame building, faced mostly in limestone, with marble at the lowest level. It was designed by the New York City firm of York & Sawyer and built in 1917–1919. The Rhode Island Hospital Trust was a banking institution founded in 1867 to manage the financial affairs of Rhode Island Hospital, founded in 1863. Over time it grew to become a significant local commercial bank, and was acquired by Bank of Boston in 1985. 

In 2005, the Rhode Island School of Design purchased the building for $47 Million. The building houses RISD's Fleet Library, Portfolio Cafe, and several floors of dormitory space.

The building was listed on the National Register of Historic Places in 1976.

Gallery

See also
 National Register of Historic Places listings in Providence, Rhode Island

References

External links

Commercial buildings completed in 1917
Bank buildings on the National Register of Historic Places in Rhode Island
Rhode Island School of Design
National Register of Historic Places in Providence, Rhode Island
Historic district contributing properties in Rhode Island
Skyscrapers in Providence, Rhode Island
1917 establishments in Rhode Island